João José Pontes Campos (born 22 September 1958 in Albufeira) is a Portuguese former middle-distance runner who competed in the 1980 Summer Olympics and in the 1984 Summer Olympics.

References

1958 births
Living people
People from Albufeira
Portuguese male middle-distance runners
Portuguese male long-distance runners
Olympic athletes of Portugal
Athletes (track and field) at the 1980 Summer Olympics
Athletes (track and field) at the 1984 Summer Olympics
World Athletics Championships athletes for Portugal
S.L. Benfica athletes
World Athletics Indoor Championships winners
Sportspeople from Faro District